The United States' National Security Agency (NSA), an intelligence agency of the federal government, publishes many documents on the history and technology of cryptology, cryptography, and cryptanalysis through various publications.

 Cryptolog is published monthly by PI, Techniques and Standards, for the Personnel of Operations". Declassified issues are available online.
 The Cryptologic Almanac is a cryptology academic journal published internally by the NSA. It publishes short vignettes about NSA or NSA-related topics. A selection of articles published are available to the public online.
 Cryptologic Quarterly was the combined result of the merger of NSA Technical Journal and Cryptologic Spectrum in 1981. It expanded its coverage to cover a larger segment of NSA readership.
 Cryptologic Spectrum was a cryptology journal published internally by the NSA. It was established in 1969, until consolidation with the NSA Technical Journal in 1981. A selection of articles published between 1969 and 1981 are available to the public online. The journal had been classified until its tables of contents were published online in September 2006 following a Freedom of Information Act request in 2003.
 The NSA Technical Journal was established in 1954 by Ralph J. Canine to "foster the exchange of ideas and create an 'intellectual community' within the Agency".  In 1981, the publication was consolidated with Cryptologic Spectrum into a single publication, called Cryptologic Quarterly.

See also 
 Military Cryptanalytics
 The World Factbook
 World Leaders

References

External links
Declassification and Transparency page on the NSA website

National Security Agency
Cryptography publications
United States Department of Defense publications